New York's 3rd State Assembly district is one of the 150 districts in the New York State Assembly. It has been represented by Joe DeStefano since 2019.

Geography
District 3 is located entirely within Suffolk County. It includes portions of the town of Brookhaven, Bellport, Mastic Beach, East Patchogue, Coram, Farmingville, Gordon Heights, Shirley, Medford, Middle Island, and Ridge.

Recent election results

2022

2020

2018

2016

2014

2012

2010

2010 special

References 

3
Suffolk County, New York